Thymosin beta-15A is a protein that in humans is encoded by the TMSB15A gene.

See also 
 Thymosins

References

Further reading